The 2021 Campeonato Pernambucano da Série A1 was the 107th edition of the state championship of Pernambuco organized by FPF. The championship began on 24 February and ended on 23 May. Salgueiro were the defending champions but they were eliminated in the semi-finals.

The finals were contested in two-legged home-and-away format between Náutico and Sport. Tied 2–2 on aggregate, Náutico won 5–3 on penalties, winning the tournament for the 23rd time. As champions, Náutico qualified for 2022 Copa do Brasil and 2022 Copa do Nordeste. The runners-up, Sport also qualified for 2022 Copa do Brasil and 2022 Copa do Nordeste (via RNC), while Salgueiro, the best placed team in the first stage not already qualified, gained the third berth for 2022 Copa do Brasil.

Teams

Ten teams were competing, eight returning from the 2020 and two promoted from the 2020 Pernambucano A2 Championship: Vera Cruz and Sete de Setembro.

The semi-finals and the first leg of the Final were played at Arena Pernambuco.

Schedule
The schedule of the competition was as follows.

First stage
In the first stage, each team played the other nine teams in a single round-robin tournament. The teams were ranked according to points (3 points for a win, 1 point for a draw, and 0 points for a loss). If tied on points, the following criteria would be used to determine the ranking: 1. Wins; 2. Goal difference; 3. Goals scored; 4. Fewest red cards; 5. Fewest yellow cards; 6. Draw in the headquarters of the FPF.

Top two teams advanced to the semi-finals of the final stages, while teams from third to sixth places advanced to the quarter-finals. The four teams with the lowest number of points played a relegation stage.

The best team not qualified for the finals qualified for 2022 Copa do Brasil. Top two teams not already qualified for 2022 Série A, Série B or Série C qualified for 2022 Série D.

Standings

Results

Relegation stage
In the relegation stage each team played the other three teams in a single round-robin tournament. The two teams with the lowest number of points were relegated to the 2022 Campeonato Pernambucano A2. The teams were ranked according to points (3 points for a win, 1 point for a draw, and 0 points for a loss). If tied on points, the following criteria would be used to determine the ranking: 1. Wins; 2. Goal difference; 3. Goals scored; 4. Fewest red cards; 5. Fewest yellow cards; 6. Draw in the headquarters of the FPF.

Standings and Results

Final stages
Starting from the quarter-finals, the teams played a single-elimination tournament with the following rules:
Quarter-finals and semi-finals were played on a single-leg basis, with the higher-seeded team hosting the leg.
 If tied, the penalty shoot-out would be used to determine the winners.
Finals were played on a home-and-away two-legged basis, with the higher-seeded team hosting the second leg.
 If tied on aggregate, the penalty shoot-out would be used to determine the winners.
Extra time would not be played and away goals rule would not be used in final stages.
Third place match was not played.

Bracket

Quarter-finals

|}

Matches

Semi-finals

|}

Matches

Náutico qualified for the 2022 Copa do Brasil.

Sport qualified for the 2022 Copa do Brasil.

Finals

|}

Matches

Náutico qualified for the 2022 Copa do Nordeste.

Overall table

Top goalscorers

2021 Campeonato Pernambucano team
The 2021 Campeonato Pernambucano team was a squad consisting of the eleven most impressive players at the tournament.

References

Campeonato Pernambucano seasons
Pernambucano